The Pizzo del Sole is a mountain of the Lepontine Alps in the Swiss canton of Ticino. With a height of 2,773 metres, it is the highest point of the Val Piora. On its southern side are located the lakes of Chiéra.

References

External links
 Pizzo del Sole

Mountains of the Alps
Mountains of Switzerland
Mountains of Ticino
Lepontine Alps